A symbol-intensive brand is a brand adopted not only for its functional benefits, but above all, for the strong symbolism and significance that it is able to transmit, allowing a consumer to express his or her identity, to signal status or manifest a sense of belonging to a group.

Businesses might be based on three different types of knowledge: analytical; synthetic or symbolic. Creative or cultural businesses, such as entertainment, publishing, design, or fashion, draw heavily on a symbolic knowledge base.  They serve important symbolic functions such as capturing, refracting, and legitimating social knowledge and values. The essence of a brand or a product in these industries resides in its meaning for the consumer rather than in its function.

The symbol-intensive brand definition has been firstly introduced by Stefania Saviolo and Antonio Marazza in the book ‘Lifestyle Brands – A Guide to Inspirational Marketing’. Analyzing a brand's choices in terms of competitive scope (number of targets and categories served) and type of benefits provided to the customer, five classes of Symbol-intensive brands are identified:

 Authority brands
 Solution brands
 Icon brands 
 Cult brands
 Lifestyle brands

Symbol-intensive brands are able to maintain a relationship with their clients that goes beyond the usual brand loyalty. Clients tend to become ambassadors, fans, champions, that find the brand fundamental or irreplaceable in their lives. Researchers have noted superior economic and financial performances in brands capable of engaging people or influencing a social context proposing an original point of view.

List of symbol intensive brands
 Apple
 Harley Davidson
 Disney
 Levi Strauss & Co.
 Nike
 Starbucks
 Jollibee
 Sanrio
 Haribo
 Lindt
 Swarovski
 Tabasco sauce
 McDonald's
 Nintendo
 Burberry
 Lego
 Lacoste
 Mattel
 Krispy Kreme
 Playboy

References

Brand management
Types of branding